Hrabské is a village and municipality in Bardejov District in the Prešov Region of north-east Slovakia.

History
In historical records the village was first mentioned in 1338.

Geography
The municipality lies at an altitude of 230 metres and covers an area of 7.855 km².
It has a population of about 500 people.

Genealogical resources

The records for genealogical research are available at the state archive "Statny Archiv in Presov, Slovakia"

 Roman Catholic church records (births/marriages/deaths): 1792-1899 (parish B)
 Greek Catholic church records (births/marriages/deaths): 1830-1898 (parish A)

See also
 List of municipalities and towns in Slovakia

References

External links
 
Hrabské - The Carpathian Connection
Surnames of living people in Hrabske

Villages and municipalities in Bardejov District
Šariš